The  Mustang  is a Chesapeake Bay brogan, built in 1907. She is located at Annapolis, Anne Arundel County, Maryland.

She was listed on the National Register of Historic Places in 1980.

References

External links
, including undated photo, at Maryland Historical Trust

Anne Arundel County, Maryland
Ships on the National Register of Historic Places in Maryland
Individual sailing vessels
National Register of Historic Places in Annapolis, Maryland